All-American Murder is a 1991 American direct-to-video thriller film directed by Anson Williams and starring Christopher Walken and Charlie Schlatter. It was released on December 18, 1991, in UK.

Premise
Artie Logan (Schlatter) is the new guy on campus. Suddenly, he meets Tally Fuller: the most popular and beautiful girl at Fairfield college and she finally agrees to go on a date with him. But that night she is brutally killed by a blowtorch-wielding maniac and Artie is wrongfully arrested. Despite protests from other police officers, detective P.J. Decker (Walken) believes Artie's story and gives him 24 hours to track down the real killer. But, as Artie gets closer to the killer, each suspect is murdered and all the clues point to him.

Cast
 Christopher Walken as P.J. Decker
 Charlie Schlatter as Artie Logan
 Josie Bissett as Tally Fuller
 Joanna Cassidy as Erica Darby
 Richard Kind as Lou Alonzo
 Woody Watson as Frank Harley
 Mitchell Anderson as Doug Sawyer

Production
The town in the film is Sand Springs, Oklahoma. The campus in the film is Oklahoma State University, in Stillwater. The football scenes, the stadium and the shower scene were all filmed at Union High School's Tuttle Stadium in Tulsa, Oklahoma, in May 1991.

External links
 

Films set in Tulsa, Oklahoma
1991 direct-to-video films
1991 films
1990s mystery thriller films
American mystery thriller films
American direct-to-video films
Direct-to-video thriller films
1990s English-language films
Films directed by Anson Williams
Films shot in Oklahoma
Trimark Pictures films
1990s American films